"The Saga of Carl" is the twenty-first and penultimate episode of the twenty-fourth season of the American animated television series The Simpsons, and the 529th episode overall. It originally aired on the Fox network in the United States on May 19, 2013, in conjunction with the season finale, "Dangers on a Train". The Icelandic band Sigur Rós scored original music for the episode, along with their own interpretation of the Simpsons opening theme.

Plot
Bart and Lisa become addicted to Ki-Ya Karate Monsters, a new animated show that features monsters and mythical creatures who are karate warriors. Marge becomes annoyed at their play-fighting and insists they go to a museum, only to find the main attraction there is The Science of Ki-Ya Karate Monsters. At another exhibit on probability, Homer becomes fascinated by an educational video featuring French philosopher Blaise Pascal that discusses the odds of winning the lottery. That week, Homer, Lenny, Carl and Moe's weekly lottery ticket wins them a total of $200,000 which they agree to share four ways. Carl goes to cash in the ticket while the others prepare for a celebration party that night. When he does not show up that night, the others realize that he has fled with all the money.

After some genealogy research assisted by Lisa, Homer discovers that Carl fled to his ancestors' home country of Iceland (Carl's Icelandic heritage was first alluded to in the Season 14 episode 'Scuse Me While I Miss the Sky".) Homer, Lenny, and Moe fly out to Reykjavík to track him down and claim their rightful share of the money. They arrive and meet a man who tells them about the Carlsons' shameful family history, detailed in an Icelandic saga. The ancient text depicts them as cowards who failed to stop the barbarian invaders from breaking into Iceland 1,000 years earlier and causing massive destruction. When they track down Carl at the Carlson family home, they learn that the reason he traveled to Iceland was to clear his family name by buying a lost page from the sagas that he believes will reveal that the Carlsons were actually brave warriors. He also says that he did not tell them this because he does not consider them real friends, that they are just guys who do lame "guy stuff" like drinking and seeing movies. An infuriated Lenny finally snaps and begins brawling with Carl, and in the aftermath of the fight the guys capture the lost page and walk out on Carl.

At first the guys simply plan to destroy the page, but a Skype call from Marge makes them feel sympathetic towards Carl's plight, and they decide to translate the page and then use the information to help him. They learn to read ancient Icelandic and discover from the page that the Carlson ancestors were actually even worse than people had thought—they were actually collaborators who not only let the barbarians into Iceland without any qualms but joined them in looting, arson, and mass murder. This increases their sorrow for what Carl has been through even more.

Gathering all of the Icelandic people in a public square, the guys explain to them the good deeds that Carl has done for them over the years; he once helped Lenny move, helped Moe paint his house, and always leaves leftover beers in Homer's fridge. Impressed by his good qualities and "many small kindnesses", the Icelandic people officially forgive the Carlson family and their reputation is cleared so they can finally show their faces in public again. When Carl's father asks him how he cannot accept that Homer, Lenny and Moe are true friends, Carl begins crying and says that he cannot deny they are, and the men all reunite with friendship and love.

Back in Springfield, Carl thanks his friends for having taught them the true values of friendship. Homer, who had planned to put in a fancy swimming pool with his $50,000 share of the lottery money, partners instead with Moe, Lenny, and Carl to create mini-pools made out of beer kegs that everyone enjoys – except for Homer himself, once he gets stuck in his new Duff-pool.

Reception

Ratings
The episode received a 1.9 in the 18–49 demographic and was watched by a total of 4.01 million viewers. However, it was the second most watched show on Fox's Animation Domination lineup that night.

Critical reception
Robert David Sullivan of The A.V. Club gave the episode a B−, saying "It’s not a very funny episode, but you get the sense that the animators enjoyed getting out of Springfield, and the score for the Iceland scenes, by indie rock group Sigur Ros, is at least a welcome change from the old-timey music that the show has been inexplicably fond of this season."

References

External links 
 

The Simpsons (season 24) episodes
2013 American television episodes
Sigur Rós
Television episodes set in Iceland